Elisheva Bikhovski (born Elizaveta Ivanovna Zhirkov; September 20, 1888 – March 27, 1949) — was a Russian-Hebrew poet, writer, literary critic and translator, often known simply by her adopted Biblical Hebrew name Elishéva. Her Russian Orthodox father, Ivan Zhirkov, was a village teacher who later became a bookseller and textbook publisher; her mother was descended from Irish Catholics who had settled in Russia after the Napoleonic Wars (1803–1815). Elisheva wrote most of her works in Hebrew, and also translated English and Hebrew poetry into Russian.

On the death of her mother in 1891, she moved to Moscow with her aunt, an older sister of her mother, where she lived surrounded by the English language and culture. Though not culturally Jewish, she became the classmate of Jewish girls who introduced her to their culture and traditions, and she began to write poetry in 1907. Not at first differentiating between Hebrew and Yiddish as the “language of the Jews,” she began studying Yiddish — which, she wrote, because of its kinship to other European languages, especially German, she found easy to understand. She learned the Hebrew alphabet from a Hebrew grammar book owned by her brother, the philologist and Esperantist Lev Zhirkov (1885–1963), a specialist in Persian and Caucasian languages. She studied both Russian and English literature, graduating from a grammar school for girls and in 1910 becoming certified as a teacher at a progressive school of Stanislaus Shatsky's and Alexander Zelenko's Children's Work and Play Society through courses that trained preschool and elementary teachers according to the system of the innovative German educator Friedrich Fröbel (1782–1852).

Hebrew education

Pre-revolutionary times
Elisheva recalls in her memoir that already in elementary school she had become familiar with names of places that featured in adventure books for young people, including several Latin American cities and Galveston, Texas. Her interest in Hebrew was kindled after she chanced upon a Hebrew-language newspaper and saw an advertisement for a steamship company recommended as an easy, convenient way to cross the Atlantic Ocean. At that time Galveston was a major port of entry to the United States for European emigrants, and with the aid of a German-language textbook for scholars of Biblical Hebrew, she was able to puzzle out first the name of Galveston and later the names of other geographical locations from which telegrams were sent for newspaper publication, such as London, Saint Petersburg and Berlin. But except for the datelines at the tops of news stories, she was unable to comprehend anything from that newspaper. Eventually, she writes, someone explained that there were two separate “Jewish” languages, both written in the same letters but very, very different in vocabulary and grammar.

Thus it was that in 1913 she began studying Hebrew through evening classes at the “Общество распространения правильных сведений о евреях и еврействе”, Obshchestvo rasprostraneniya pravil'nykh svedeniy o yevreyakh i yevreystve (“Society for the dissemination of correct information about Jews and Judaism”), founded in 1906 by a group of Jewish public figures in Moscow that included Uri Nissan Gnessin (1879–1913), Yosef Haim Brenner (1881–1921), Echiel Tschlenow (1864–1918) and her future husband, Simeon Bikhovski (1880–1932), who also began the publishing house Nisyonot (“Experiments”) in that year. For the first three months she had a young teacher whom she characterized as “both incredibly gifted and infinitely devoted to his cause.” The lessons were conducted by the direct method of “Hebrew through Hebrew”, mainly through oral instruction and without a textbook.

“From the first lesson, I left with a precise knowledge of only two Hebrew words, but of the truth of this knowledge I did not have the slightest doubt. I knew what it means when the teacher turns to his pupils and asks, “אתם מבינים”, Atem mevinim? (‘Do you understand?’). I had not seen the Hebrew letters yet, and only learned the sounds by ear. But this knowledge — as well as what was added over time in these lessons — was solid and thorough. It was systematic and correct knowledge that was impossible for me to lose.”

Although that teacher was popular with his pupils, he aroused suspicion for going about in Moscow with a light summer coat and without galoshes. He had invited some of his students, who did not know enough Hebrew to be able to study on their own, to take Russian-language lessons in the Tanakh, or Jewish scriptures. The lessons, sporadic and conducted at the homes of various students, led to the group's being perceived as a new and possibly dangerous revolutionary group, and arrests and an inquiry followed. Lacking the required “право жительства”, pravo zhitel'stva (right of residence) in the capital, the teacher was regarded as living there illegally and was forced to leave Moscow, but Elisheva continued to learn Hebrew off and on during the next two years.

Soviet era
On the death of her father in 1917, Elisheva returned to Ryazan, the city of her birth. With that year's fall of the Russian monarchy, she witnessed street demonstrations “in celebration of freedom”, which had been forbidden under the former regime. In one of these demonstrations, she participated with a group of Jewish youths, marching in an orderly way under the new national flag singing Hatikvah, a modified version of which eventually became Israel’s national anthem.

In Ryazan, with some sleuthing and the help of a local rabbi, she was led to a scholar in an attic room who used to tutor boys in reciting the Jewish prayer book, the Siddur. This teacher — very young but with a thick, curly black beard — she wrote, combined “a taste for biblical grandeur with childlike naïveté.” After she demonstrated her ability to read the prayer book's morning blessing (Modah ani lefanecha... (“I thank You...”), he consented to help her continue her Hebrew study. Unfortunately, she wrote, he tended to direct conversation towards social and political problems, and her language lessons with him did not long continue.

She tried from time to time to study with Kantorovich's “Теория иврита”, Teoriya ivrita, a book she disparaged as “clearly outdated” with Russian explanations, translation exercises from Hebrew into Russian and back, and many “completely meaningless”, context-free sentences like: “Reuben lay on the bed with a bandage on his forehead.” Later she found another teacher, but, Elisheva writes, neither he nor she had suitable textbooks. Though that teacher had taught for many years, he had never taught the direct method, so they had to make use of Kantorovich's book.

From 1918 to 1919 she studied with another Hebrew teacher, a graduate of Herzliya Hebrew Gymnasium in Jaffa, a city that the British forces had just captured from the Ottoman Empire and which soon became part of the British Mandate for Palestine. The young man had come to Russia to visit relatives but had been drafted into the army. Wearing his regulation bulky grey uniform and so-called beetle-crusher boots, he met Elisheva in the street and the two were able to converse in Hebrew with the Sephardic pronunciation that Eliezer Ben Yehuda, the reviver of modern spoken Hebrew, was said to have preferred to the Ashkenazic one. “Before then,” she said, “it had not occurred to any of my teachers that it was possible to have a conversation in Hebrew.”

Writing career
Beginning in 1915, Elisheva's first translations from Yiddish into Russian were published in the Russian-language Jewish journal “Еврейская Жизнь” Evreskaya Zhizn (“Jewish Life”). These are mainly short stories by Hersh Dovid Nomberg (1876–1927), poems by Shmuel-Yankev Imber (1889–1942?) and indirect translations, via Hayim Nahman Bialik's Yiddish version, of the Hebrew poems of the 12th-century Judah Halevi. Later she began to translate into Russian the works of contemporary Hebrew writers such as Gershon Shofman (1880–1972) and Yosef Haim Brenner (1881–1921).

During her time in Ryazan between 1917 and 1919, as her Hebrew skills were deepening, she composed over 200 Russian poems, published by her fiancé Simeon Bikhovski in two 1919 collections, “Минуты” Minuty (“Minutes”) and “Тайные песни” Tainye Pesni (“Secret songs”). Both were published under her pseudonym “E. Lisheva” and showed a strong attachment to and longing for Jewish culture. From 1920, when she married Bikhovski, she published her first poems in Hebrew and definitively adopted the name Elisheva  instead of her original Russian given name Elizaveta. Apparently influenced by both her original Hebrew teacher and by her husband, she now adopted Hebrew as her sole working language and ceased writing in Russian; Simeon himself adopted the Hebrew form of his name as Shimon. They married in a civil registry office because their difference of religions prohibited a religious wedding.

Elisheva's poetry also appeared in the almanac Ha-Tkufa (“Epoch”, Warsaw, 1921), the magazine Ha-Toren (“The Mast”, New York, 1922), Hapoel Hatzair (“The Young Worker”, Tel Aviv, 1923) and "Ha-Olam" ( "The World", London, 1925). In 1925 the Bikhovskis moved to Palestine, with their young daughter Miriam (b. 1924), settling near the Herzliya Hebrew Gymnasium in Jaffa. There she published two poetry collections, Kos ktana (“Small Bowl,” Tel Aviv, 1926) and Haruzim (“Rhymes,” Tel Aviv, 1928), and her employment of Sephardic pronunciation in her poetry became the accepted norm. As one of Palestine's first Hebrew poets, Elisheva helped give form to the literary life of the emerging country, explaining: “I can point to but one goal in my work — to aid as much as possible in the development of Hebrew poetry in the Hebrew language that we speak among ourselves every day with the Sephardic pronunciation. Therefore I have refrained from all experimentation and pursuit of new forms or innovations in my poetry, because first and foremost I want to see Hebrew poetry that is vital, natural and inextricably linked with our language and our lives.”

The Jewish public were quite moved by Elisheva's having left her people and language behind to join the Jewish newcomers in their emergent homeland in Palestine. The literary community initially greeted her with enthusiasm, arranging readings of her works, which were widely published, even to the point that her popularity aroused resentment of some young poets (the Ketuvim “Writings” group, headed by Avraham Shlonsky, 1900–1973) and made her a target in their struggle against the older poets (the Moznayim “Scales” group, led by Hayyim Nahman Bialik, of which Elisheva herself was a member). This period lasted only seven years (1925–1932), during which Elisheva produced the bulk of her Hebrew poetry, prose, essays and literary criticism, with works published in the Hebrew press in Palestine (Moznayim, Do’ar ha-Yom) and abroad (Ha-Tkufa, Ha-Toren and Ha-Olam), or in books published by her husband's publishing house, Tomer. Elisheva: Kovez Ma’amarim odot ha-Meshoreret Elisheva (“Elisheva: Collected articles about the poet Elisheva” appeared in several editions in Tel Aviv and Warsaw, beginning in 1927, and Meshorer ve-Adam (“Poet and man”), an essay on the poetry of Alexander Blok, appeared in 1929). Kos Ketanah was the first book of poems by a woman poet, and Simta’ot the first novel by a woman, to be published in Palestine. Some of her small and melodious poems have been set to music, translations of individual Hebrew poems into Yiddish, Russian, Dutch, English, French, German, Hungarian, Italian, Polish and Welsh have been published by various periodicals, and new translations into Russian were included in a collection entitled Я себя до конца рассказала (“I told myself before the end,” Biblioteka Alia, 1981, 1990.)

In later years
Despite her writing career and his publishing business, the couple often found themselves in dire financial straits, and Elisheva was several times forced to leave her husband and daughter behind for literary tours of Jewish communities in Europe where she did poetry readings and told stories to large audiences at specially arranged events; during the school vacation in summer, her husband and daughter would accompany her. In the summer of 1932, in the midst of such a tour in Chișinău — then in Romania and now in Moldova — her husband, Shimon, suddenly died. Elisheva returned to Tel Aviv, sorrowing at her husband's death, and her attempts at earning a livelihood (among other things, as a librarian at Tel Aviv's Sha’ar Zion public library) were unsuccessful. Although she had earned a living from her literary tours of Europe, she and her daughter now fell into absolute poverty. She moved into a rundown shack on the edge of Tel Aviv, where she was saved from starvation when the poet Hayim Nahman Bialik secured for her a modest stipend of $15 monthly from the non-profit Israel Matz Foundation, a New York nonprofit organization established to aid indigent Hebrew writers.

Bitter and hurt over no longer being in literary favour among the Jews of her adopted Palestinian homeland, she cut herself off from society and ceased publishing new work. She did some translations, which she considered insignificant, but was forced to make ends meet by working as a laundress. Her daughter Miriam Littel served in the British Auxiliary Territorial Service (ATS) in Egypt during World War I and in 1946 married a British soldier, with whom she had three daughters, and in 1949 Elisheva had planned to visit them in England. Because she was not feeling well, however, some friends from the Davar HaPoelet women's magazine paid for her to have a visit to the hot springs in Tiberias, where she died of cancer on March 27, 1949. Despite the deep affection Elisheva maintained for Jewish culture and its involvement in the eventual establishment of the state of Israel, she had never converted to Judaism — a fact that she never hid; she always remained an Orthodox Christian — so difficulties arose as to the place of burial. Only upon the intervention of the chairman of the Hebrew Writers Association in Israel was it agreed that she could be buried in the cemetery of Kvutzat Kinneret, near the grave of the poet Rachel Bluwstein.

Literary critique of Elisheva
According to Yaffah Berlovitz, Elisheva represented the early 20th-century schools of Futurist and Acmeist poetry, which supplanted the Russian Symbolist movement of the late 19th century.

“The Acmeist school advocates short lyrical poems phrased simply, clearly and melodically, reminiscent of a painting with rapid brush strokes and a fragile, aesthetic line. ‘My poetry is brief, a cloud in the sky,’ in Elisheva’s words; nonetheless, she also incorporates anti-Acmeist elements, for example, a longing for the mysterious and dreamlike, or a reference to Symbolist expressions. These elements are the consequence of a conflicted, questioning worldview at the centre of which lies a profound sense of alienation (‘I had no mother; I will have no son’), while at the same time there is a relentless longing for an unidentified metaphysical entity (‘a God without name’) that can promise her vitality and happiness as a human being and an artist. This melancholic spiritual confession, which does not commit itself to any specific religion, also frames her poetic space as an endless pilgrimage of wandering and despair — a journey embarked on with the clear knowledge that no utopian ‘land of Avalon’ awaits her at its end (‘All my soul yearns/for the land of false hopes’).

“This sense of a conflicted state of existence — between a reality of abandonment and exile on the one hand, and the pursuit of a promised land on the other, between the ‘grey day’ of the secular and the ‘enchanted night’ of the sacred — draws Elisheva closer to the Jewish people. She identifies her fate with theirs: ‘Only on the setting sun will my eyes gaze/Only on the Eastern Star — your heart’s lament/Who will say to us all that there is no Homeland?’ (“Galut,” Toren 57). Thus it is not surprising that she connected with Zionist Jewish circles in particular, nor that she chose to immigrate to Palestine, which for her represented the source of creativity and inspiration: ‘When it seems to me at times that the wellspring of my poetry has run dry, I am struck by the feeling: There, in the land of beauty, the Divine Presence will shine on me once more.’

“The poetic oeuvre of Elisheva can be divided geographically into Russian and Palestinian chapters; not so her prose, which deals solely with the reality of the early decades of the twentieth century in Russia. Her transition to prose was inspired by the poet Alexander Blok, whom she regarded as her greatest teacher (‘More than ‘simply’ a poet, he is the essence of our life’). In her essay Meshorer ve-Adam, she examines his writing, stressing his uniqueness, which stems from a dynamic of expansiveness that constantly leads him to a different poetic experience (thematic, genre-related or formative) and, at the very least, avoids creative stagnation. Elisheva adopted this challenging principle, expanding her horizons from the lyric poem to the short story, and from the lyrical short story to the realistic novel.

“Each of her six short stories revolves around a woman who speaks of herself in the third person, against the backdrop of her own life story and environment. Although the setting differs from story to story, all of the protagonists seem drawn from the same ‘confessional I’ that is so dominant in Elisheva’s poems as well. It is the portrait of a woman unable to communicate with those around her; amid the conflict between herself and her surroundings, she constructs — in a manner unique to her — her own inner spiritual dream-world, which she inhabits with intensity — as in Yamim Arukim (“Long days”) and Ha-Emet (“The truth”). This imaginary spiritual world also reinforces the Jewish-Christian conflict, which is expressed primarily within the framework of male-female relationships (Jewish woman/Christian man — Malkat ha-Ivrim (“Queen of the Hebrews”); Christian woman/Jewish man — Nerot Shabbat (“Sabbath candles”), which refers to Elisheva herself: ‘Because I have two souls — one Russian and one Hebrew.’

“This conflict is further developed in her novel Simta’ot, which deals with Moscow of the early 1920s, during the brief period when Lenin was in power and attempted to restore the collapsing Soviet economy. Elisheva offers us a glimpse into Moscow’s bohemian scene at this historical juncture, with its mélange of men and women, Christians and Jews, engaged in the various arts; through them, she examines the cultural-political upheaval of post-revolution Russia, combining feminist tendencies on the one hand with Zionist leanings on the other. There is no question that through this novel Elisheva contributed thematic constructs previously unknown to Hebrew literature in both Palestine and the Diaspora: a depiction of the “new woman” of the post-World War I era; the self-portrait of woman-as-creator; and the dialogue between Christians and Jews, as seen from a non-Jewish perspective.

“Elisheva was received with ambivalence by the Jewish public in the Diaspora and in Palestine. On the one hand, Jews were flattered by her decision to work in Hebrew (‘the language of the heart and of twilight,’ as she put it); not without reason was she referred to as ‘Ruth from the banks of the Volga’ (in an allusion to the biblical Ruth the Moabite). On the other hand, there were critics who attacked the quality of her writing and the level of her Hebrew, arguing that her work was highly overrated. Not so today. A fresh reading of her work, especially from a feminist perspective, reveals a creative diversity that enriched modern Hebrew poetry and prose with a feminine voice all its own — a voice that offered not only content and range but an inner rhythm with its own unique meter and cadence. At a time when the majority of poets based themselves on the Ashkenazic pronunciation of the Diaspora, she was one of the first to accentuate her verse according to the Sephardic stress on the final syllable (which eventually became the dominant form in Palestine and, later, in Israel).”

Books published in Hebrew
 1926: Kos Ketanah (“A little cup”), poetry
 1926: Im Or Boker Be-Kol Rinah (“With morning light and a joyful song”), poetry
 1928: Haruzim (“Rhymes”), poetry
 1928: Sipurim (“Stories”), short stories
 1929: Simta’ot (“Alleys”), novel
 1929: Mikreh Tafel (“A minor incident”), story
 1946: Shirim, (“Poems”)
 1970: Yalkut shirim (“Collected poems”)

References

Sources
 Arnon, Yochanan. “Our Sister Elisheva.” Et Mol (July 1978): 41–42.
 Barzel, Hillel. Elisheva and Her Novel Simta’ot. Tel Aviv: 1977, 280–298.
 Berlovitz, Yaffah. “Ruth from the Banks of the Volga.” Maariv Literary Supplement, June 8, 2000, 27. Berlovitz, Yaffah. “Round and Round the Garden: Mikreh Tafel and Five Other Stories.” Davar, April 22, 1977, 16.
 Elisheva, From My Memoirs. Elisheva Archives, Genazim (7863/5), Saul Tchernichowsky House, Tel Aviv
 Elisheva: The Collected Poems, with an introduction by Haim Toren. Tel Aviv: 1970, 9–16.
 Elisheva: Collected Articles about the Poet Elisheva. Warsaw and Tel Aviv: 1927.
 Kornhendler, Shulamit. “The Principle of Expansion of the Genre in the Work of Elisheva” Hebrew-language Master's thesis, Bar-Ilan University, 1999.
 Meron, Dan. Founding Mothers, Stepsisters. Tel Aviv: 1991, 25–33, 103–104, 154–155.
 Rattok, Lily, ed. “Every Woman Knows It: An Afterword,” in The Other Voice: Hebrew Women’s Literature. Tel Aviv: 1994, 268–269, 336–337.
 Rav-Hon, Orna. “The Confessional Model in the Work of Elisheva.” Master's thesis, Tel Aviv University, 1989.
 Shaked, Gershon. “Elisheva Bikhovsky (Zhirkova).” Hebrew Literature, 1880–1980, vol. 3, 87–93. Tel Aviv/Jerusalem: 1988.

1888 births
1949 deaths
Translators from Yiddish
Russian women poets
20th-century Russian poets
20th-century Israeli poets
Israeli literary critics
Israeli women literary critics
Israeli translators
Eastern Orthodox writers
Feminist writers
Israeli people of Russian descent
Israeli people of Irish descent
Israeli women poets
20th-century Russian women writers
20th-century translators
Hebrew-language poets
Modern Hebrew writers
Israeli women novelists
Israeli women short story writers
Deaths from cancer in Israel